La Florida Airport  is an airport serving La Serena, a Pacific coastal city in the Coquimbo Region of Chile. This is one of a few major Chilean airports with an east–west runway (others are Balmaceda and Calama).

There are distant hills north and south.

The La Serena VOR-DME (Ident: SER) is located on the field.

Airlines and destinations

History
On January 19, 1951, Captain Roberto Parragué Singer on his plane "Manu-Tara" took off from La Florida Airport and landed on Hanga Roa, Easter Island the next day, achieving the first flight ever to Easter Island.

Accidents and incidents
On December 9, 1982, Aeronor Flight 304 crashed short of the runway, killing all 46 passengers and crew.

See also
Transport in Chile
List of airports in Chile

References

External links
OpenStreetMap - La Florida
OurAirports - La Florida
FallingRain - La Florida Airport

Airports in Coquimbo Region
La Serena, Chile